Adele Änggård (born Adele Hankey, 31 July 1933) is a British-Swedish stage and costume designer whose career has spanned some of the most significant major stages across Europe and Scandinavia. In parallel she's actively pursued archeology and writing, and in later life contributed new interpretations on early European civilizations.

Background and education 

Adele Hankey was daughter of Robert Hankey, 2nd Baron Hankey. From 1948 to 1953 she studied ballet at the Elmhurst Ballet School with a focus on art and design, as well as theatre at the Guildhall School of Music and Drama. From 1960 to 1963 she took a series of design courses under Paul Colin, and studied art at the Académie Julian and with André Lhote at his studio. In 1972 she studied television and film at the College of San Mateo.

Career 

Änggård has had a long and prolific career in theatre, contributing to some 80 productions between 1957 and 2000. Her designs were often noted for an essential simplicity, which integrated the visual part of a performance with the drama and acting as a whole.

Prominent opera productions 

 Mäster Pedros Marionetter, Drottningholm Palace Theatre (1957) directed by Göran Gentele
 The Bear (1978) 
 Il Pastor Fido, National Opera, Oslo (1979)
 Les Mamelles de Tiresias, Oslo (1980)
 Paris and Helena, Drottningholm Palace Theatre (1987)
 La Bohème (1994) directed by Bengt Peterson
 Väntarna/Herkules, Royal Opera, Stockholm (1995)
 Noye's Fludde, Vasa Museum (1995)

Prominent ballet productions 

 Coppelia, Royal Swedish Ballet (1958) choreographed by Mary Skeaping
 While the Spider Slept, Royal Swedish Ballet (1966) and Royal Winnipeg Ballet (1967) choreographed by Brian Macdonald
 Kampen om kungakronan, Nyköping, Malmö Stadsteater and SVT (1987) choreographed by Birgit Cullberg

Prominent theatrical productions 
 King Lear, Royal Shakespeare Company (assistant designer, 1962) directed by Peter Brook
 Serjeant Musgrave's Dance (1962)
 The Deputy (Le Vicaire) (1963) 
 Hamlet (1991) directed by Anita Blom
 Othello (1992)
 Ion (1993)
 Vintergatan (1995) directed by Harald Leander 
 The Oresteia, Skillinge teater (1996) directed by Anita Blom
 Don Juan, Skillinge teater (2000) directed by Mario Gonzales

Film production 
 King Lear (1971), directed by Peter Brook

Archaeology 

In parallel to her theatre career she developed a lifetime interest in ancient Greece and archaeology, starting in childhood with archaeologist Vronwy Hankey, a Minoan and Mycenae specialist and included visits to the caves of Altamira and Lascaux. Later, as an extension of her theatrical career – so as to better understand Greek play scripts – she studied archaeology at Södertörn University, receiving a bachelor's degree.

Following extensive research, she published A Humanitarian Past in 2016. The book adds a sophisticated social dimension to early European history, and challenges modern conceptualizations of the earliest European ancestors as being underdeveloped and prehistoric art as primitive.

Notes

Swedish costume designers
British costume designers
British scenic designers
1933 births
Living people
Women scenic designers